Glenrothes  is a UK Parliamentary constituency represented in the House of Commons. It was created for the 2005 general election.

The seat is currently held by Peter Grant, of the Scottish National Party (SNP). He has held the seat since the 2015 general election after gaining the seat from the Labour Party who had held the seat since its creation.

Boundaries

The current boundaries centre on Glenrothes itself, moving south and west to include Cardenden, and a small section of Kirkcaldy. The northern and western areas include Leslie and Markinch. In the east, the seat contains Leven, Kennoway, and Methil.

History
Glenrothes was created for the 2005 general election, mostly replacing Central Fife, but incorporating small parts of Kirkcaldy and Dunfermline East.

Creation in 2005–2008
The first holder of the newly created seat was John MacDougall, who died on 13 August 2008, triggering a by-election.

2008
In the 2008 by election, Lindsay Roy was elected, the Labour majority falling by around 4,000 votes, with the Labour vote increasing by 3%; the SNP making significant gains from the lower-placed Conservative and the Liberal Democrat candidates.

2010 general election
With the 2010 general election, the Labour share of the vote increased by 10% at the expense of the SNP candidate. The winner's total reached 62% of the votes cast, which places the seat in the top decile of seats won and therefore indicates a safe seat majority. Relative to the 2005 general election the swing against the SNP was less accentuated than relative to the by-election at 4.45% of the vote on the standard two-party measure of swing, which is comparable to the national swing.

Members of Parliament

Elections

Elections in the 2010s

The Brexit Party withdrew support for Victor Farrell over homophobic remarks.

Elections in the 2000s

References

Westminster Parliamentary constituencies in Scotland
Constituencies of the Parliament of the United Kingdom established in 2005
Politics of Fife
Glenrothes